Norma Klein (May 13, 1938 – April 25, 1989) was a US young adults' book author. She was born, grew up and lived in New York City for most of her life, and studied Russian at Barnard College. She died, after a brief illness, in New York City on April 25, 1989 at the age of 50. She had a husband, Erwin Fleissner, and two daughters.

Klein was best known for her adult novel Sunshine, about a young woman with  terminal cancer, which was based upon a true story, and taken from the young woman's tape-recorded diary. She was also well known for her children's novel Mom, the Wolfman and Me about a girl with an unmarried mother. Ms. Klein's work dealt openly with controversial subjects, including racism, homosexuality, adoption, and death.

She wrote many novels for children and young adults including Family Secrets, which has been challenged for inclusion in school libraries, and is ranked at #76 on the American Library Association’s list of most challenged books for 1990-1999.

Bibliography

Picture books
Girls Can Be Anything (1973) 
A Train for Jane (1974) If I Had My Way (1974)''' Dinosaurs Housewarming Party (1974) Naomi in the Middle (1974) Blue Trees, Red Sky (1975) A Surprise Party for Dinosaur (1977) Visiting Pamela (1990)

Books for middle readersMom, the Wolf Man and Me (1972)It's Not What You Expect (1973)Confessions of an Only Child (1974)Taking Sides (1974)What It's All about (1975)Tomboy (1978)A Honey of a Chimp (1980)Robbie and the Leap Year Blues (1981) Bizou (1983)The Cheerleader (1985)Snapshots (1986)Now That I Know (1988)

Books for teen readersHiding (1976)It's Okay If You Don't Love Me (1977) 
Jody Epstein, a New York native and senior in high school, begins dating Lyle, a Midwesterner with a more conservative background. During their relationship, she has a liaison with an ex-boyfriend, and she begins to understand the complex interrelationship between love and sex.Love is One of the Choices (1978). Two high school seniors from single-parent households, Caroline and Maggie, explore sexuality and the changing role of women in the world. Caroline has a sexual relationship with her chemistry teacher.Breaking Up (1980) 
Alison Rose, 15, daughter of divorced parents, and her older brother Martin visit her father and stepmother in Northern California for the summer after spending the school year in New York with her mother, Cynthia. During her summer in California, she becomes embroiled in tensions between her father, who attempts to gain custody, when Alison Rose's mother is found to be lesbian. Alison also falls in love with her best friend Gretchen's brother, Ethan, causing an estrangement with Gretchen.French Postcards (1980)Domestic Arrangements (1982)Queen of the What Ifs (1982)Beginner's Love (1983)The Swap (1983)Angel Face (1984)Family Secrets (1985)Give and Take (1985)Going Backwards (1986)My Life As a Body (1987)Older Men (1988)That's My Baby (1988)No More Saturday Nights (1988) 
Tim Weber, a high school senior who has gotten his girlfriend Cheryl pregnant, decides to keep the baby himself instead of putting him up for adoption. He takes his son, Mason, to school with him at Columbia University and faces the challenges of being pre-med and a teenaged father.Learning How to Fall (1989)Just Friends (1990)

Books for adultsLove and other Euphemisms (1975). A collection of early short stories. Sunshine (1975). One of Norma Klein's most popular novels. Based on the true story of a young mother with terminal cancer. Girls Turn Wives (1976)Give Me One Good Reason (1977)Coming to Life (1977)Sunshine Christmas (1978)Sunshine Years (1981)Wives and Other Women (1982)Sextet in a Minor (1983). A collection of short stories.Lovers (1984)Baryshnikov's Nutcracker (1986)American Dreams (1987)The World As It Is'' (1989)

References

External links
 Norma Klein bibliography at fantasticfiction.co.uk

1938 births
1989 deaths
American children's writers
American women novelists
Writers from New York City
American writers of young adult literature
20th-century American novelists
20th-century American women writers
American women children's writers
Women writers of young adult literature
Novelists from New York (state)